"Flat Beat" is an instrumental by French musician Mr. Oizo. It was released on 22 March 1999 through F Communications and was included as a bonus track on his debut studio album, Analog Worms Attack. An accompanying music video was released on VHS. The music video features Flat Eric, a puppet, head banging to the track.

Widely publicized by Flat Eric's appearance in many commercials for Levi's and the popularity of the music video, the track became a surprise European hit. "Flat Beat" peaked at number five on the French Singles Chart and reached number one in Austria, Finland, Flanders, Germany, Italy, and the United Kingdom. In 2003, Q Magazine ranked "Flat Beat" at number 175 in their list of the "1001 Best Songs Ever".

Background
In an interview with XLR8R magazine, Quentin Dupieux stated that it took him only two hours with a Korg MS-20 to produce. The instrumental is mainly composed of a repeated bassline, and it samples "Put Your Love in My Tender Care" by the Fatback Band.

Reception

Critical reception
Stevie Chick from NME wrote, "Leading sociologists are calling it the 'Flat Eric Phenomenon'. Red-top tabloids print instructions for the Flat Eric window moves and White Van Man is overjoyed. Yes, helped along by his friends at the Levi's company, Mr Oizo could soon be celebrating the inevitable outcome of such a profitable partnership, a Number One record. And that would be a fine thing, not least because 'Flat Beat' is a sleek slice of supremely filtered, speaker-busting electro that would undoubtedly be a minor specialist hit in its own right if released without the might of this high-profile campaign, but also because Flat Eric, the ice-cool yellow muppet, is one of the most fascinating creatures to have entered the crazy world of rock'n'roll in recent memory."

Commercial reception
The song was a surprise international success in Europe, topping the charts in Austria, Finland, Flanders, Germany, Italy, and the United Kingdom. In the latter country, it was the seventh song featured in a Levi's advert to top the UK Singles Chart and the 25th instrumental single to top the chart. On the Eurochart Hot 100, "Flat Beat" peaked at number two and was Europe's 11th-most-successful hit of 1999. "Flat Beat" was not as successful in France, where it peaked at number five and did not receive airplay, selling only a quarter of the copies as it did in the UK. In September 2005, Stylus Magazine included the track's bassline at number 13 in their list of the "Top 50 Basslines of All Time".

Music video

Prior to the "Flat Beat", Dupieux created Flat Eric, a fictional puppet character, for Levi's commercials for Sta-Prest One Crease Denim Clothing, built by Jim Henson's Creature Shop. The popularity of the commercials lead to a music video for the song being created, also featuring Flat Eric.

The music video for "Flat Beat" was directed by Quentin Dupieux and released alongside the single release. The video was released on VHS and later on digital download services and YouTube on the official F Communications channel. The video was listed in Maxims list of Best Puppets in a Music Video.

Track listings

Charts and certifications

Weekly charts

Year-end charts

Certifications

References

External links
 Flat Eric - French website

1990s instrumentals
1999 singles
1999 songs
Electro house songs
French electronic songs
Music videos featuring puppetry
Number-one singles in Austria
Number-one singles in Finland
Number-one singles in Germany
Number-one singles in Italy
Number-one singles in Scotland
Techno songs
UK Independent Singles Chart number-one singles
UK Singles Chart number-one singles
Ultratop 50 Singles (Flanders) number-one singles